The Rustle of Silk is a 1923 American silent romantic drama film directed by Herbert Brenon and starring Betty Compson. It was produced by Famous Players-Lasky and distributed by Paramount Pictures. It is based on the 1922 novel by writer Cosmo Hamilton.

Cast
Betty Compson as Lala De Breeze
Conway Tearle as Arthur Fallaray
Cyril Chadwick as Paul Chalfon
Anna Q. Nilsson as Lady Feo
Leo White as Emil
Charles A. Stevenson as Henry De Breeze
Tempe Pigott as Mrs. De Breeze
Frederick Esmelton as Blythe
Anne Shirley as Girl (credited as Dawn O'Day)

Preservation status
The Rustle of Silk is considered to be a lost film.

References

External links

1st edition cover of Cosmo Hamilton's book with still from the 1923 film
Cosmo Hamilton's book illustrated with stills from the film on pages 1, 50, 130, and 170, on the Internet Archive

1923 films
American silent feature films
Films directed by Herbert Brenon
Lost American films
1923 romantic drama films
American romantic drama films
American black-and-white films
Films with screenplays by Ouida Bergère
Films based on British novels
1920s American films
Silent romantic drama films
Silent American drama films